Bueng Khong Long is a district (amphoe) of Bueng Kan province, northeastern Thailand.

Both this district and its Bueng Khong Long subdistrict are named after a reservoir south of Bueng Khong Long town. The reservoir was created in the 1980s under a royal initiative by the late-King Bhumibol Adulyadej to provide irrigation for farmers as well as to enhance biodiversity. The lake's wetlands are an important stopover point for migrating birds, and also a spawning ground for fish. Fish are a key protein source for locals.

History
The minor district was split off from Seka district on 7 January 1986. It was upgraded to a full district on 4 November 1993.

Geography
Neighboring districts are (from the south clockwise): Ban Phaeng and Na Thom of Nakhon Phanom province; Seka and Bung Khla of Bueng Kan Province. To the east across the Mekong River is the Laotian province Bolikhamxai.

Administration

Central administration 
Bueng Khong Long district is divided into four sub-districts (tambons), which are further subdivided into 57 administrative villages (mubans).

Local administration 
There are two sub-district municipalities (thesaban tambons) in the district:
 Bueng Khong Long consisting of parts of sub-districts Bueng Khong Long and Pho Mak Khaeng.
 Bueng Ngam consisting of parts of sub-district Bueng Khong Long.

There are three sub-district administrative organizations (SAO) in the district:
 Pho Mak Khaeng consisting of parts of sub-district Pho Mak Khaeng.
 Dong Bang consisting of the sub-district Dong Bang.
 Tha Dok Kham consisting of the sub-district Tha Dok Kham.

References

External links
amphoe.com

 
Districts of Bueng Kan province
Populated places on the Mekong River